"The Metre" and "Waiting for the Sun" are two songs released together as a double A-Side single by Powderfinger in support of their fourth studio album Odyssey Number Five. It was released on 27 August 2001 as the album's final single. "The Metre" and "Waiting for the Sun" both had music videos produced. "Waiting for the Sun" also featured on Powderfinger's compilation album, Fingerprints: The Best of Powderfinger, 1994-2000.

Track listing
 "The Metre" – 4:33 (Jon Coghill, John Collins, Bernard Fanning, Ian Haug, Darren Middleton)
 "Waiting for the Sun" – 3:54 (Coghill, Collins, Fanning, Haug, Middleton)
 "Number of the Beast" – 4:55 (Steve Harris)
 "Odyssey #3" – 2:25 (Coghill, Collins, Fanning, Haug, Middleton)
 "Whatever Makes You Happy" (piano version) – 2:27 (Fanning)

Charts

Notes

Powderfinger songs
Universal Records singles
2001 singles